William Badger (1779–1852) was an American manufacturer and governor of New Hampshire.

William Badger may also refer to:

William Badger (died 1629), member of parliament (MP) for Winchester
William Badger (died 1578), MP for Cricklade (UK Parliament constituency)
William Badger (shipbuilder) (1752–1830), master shipbuilder operating in Kittery, Maine, United States who built more than 100 vessels
Bill Badger, fictional character from Bill Badger and the Pirates
William R. Badger (1886–1911), pioneer aviator
William Thompson Badger (1884–1926), politician in Saskatchewan, Canada